Algeria is the largest country in Africa; one of the main tourist attractions is the Sahara, the largest desert in the world. Algeria has been a member of the World Tourism Organization since 1976. According to a report of the World Tourism Organization published in 2014, Algeria was the 4th largest tourist destination in Africa in 2013 with 2.7 million foreign tourists, and ranks 111th on the international tourism scene, according to the London-based World Tourism and Travel Council (WTTC). The tourism sector in Algeria accounts for 3.9% of the volume of exports, 9.5% of the productive investment rate and 8.1% of the gross domestic product.

The main competitors are other Mediterranean countries, the majority of which have developed a strong tourism-based economy. The tourism sector is still underdeveloped in Algeria concerning accommodation and other services. For this reason, the government launched a strategic plan to boost this sector by 2025.

According to the U.S. News & World Report, Algeria was ranked among the top 80 countries in the world in 2018.

The US national newspaper USA Today ranked Constantine among the eleven cities to visit the world in 2018. The newspaper was based on the experience of Sal Lavallo, one of the youngest people to have visited all 193 member states of the United Nations.

Tourism policy of the state

A project developed during the "National and International Conference of Tourism" was born providing a new dynamics of reception and management of tourism in Algeria. This project is called (Horizon 2025). Foreign investors, mainly French, position themselves to dominate the market, focused mainly on a business clientele.

An initial advertising campaign was rolled out to attract investors and foreign customers, along with conferences, trade shows and commissions.

The World Cup-winning former footballer Zinedine Zidane of Algerian descent was also used for a new commercial carried out under the aegis of the telephony operator, Ooredoo Algeria, intended for an international audience.

A Quality Tourism Plan Algeria was adopted by the government but by the end of 2010, only 10% of tourist structures in Algeria have joined this program. Investors remain interested in the potential of the country, as well as the high authorities, as the representative of the Secretary-General of the World Tourism Organization (WTO), Frédéric Perret, told the conference of the International Tourism and Travel Exhibition held In Algeria in 2010, that the Algerian tourism sector has great potential thanks to its "Mediterranean beaches, its fascinating Djurdjura National Park, its human, cultural and historical treasures."

As part of the tourism development policy, 'Eductour' is regularly organized for the national and international.

World Heritage Sites 
Algeria is home to seven UNESCO World Heritage Sites.

Religion in Algeria is dominated by Islam at about ninety-nine percent of the population.  The vast majority of Muslims in Algeria adhere to Sunni Islam of Maliki school of jurisprudence. There are also almost 100,000 Christians, mostly Pentecostal Protestants.  There are nearly 2,000 Jews living in Algeria, according to the US department of State.

This is a list of some of the best-known mosques and churches in Algeria:

Djamaâ El Djazaïr

Djamaâ El Djazaïr (Mosque of Algeria, in Arabic: جامع الجزائر); or Great Mosque of Algeria (in Arabic: مسجد الجزائر الأعظم) is a mosque in the process of completion, located in Mohammedia in Algiers. It is the largest mosque in Algeria and Africa and the third largest mosque in the world by total area, after the Great Mosque of Mecca and the Al-Masjid an-Nabawi Mosque in Medina.

Ketchaoua Mosque

Ketchaoua Mosque is a mosque in Algiers. It is located at the foot of the Casbah, which was built during the Ottoman rule in the 17th century, which is a UNESCO World Heritage Site. The mosque stands on the first of the Casbah's many steep stairways, and was logistically and symbolically the cynosure of the pre-colonial city of Algiers. The mosque is noted for its unique fusion of Moorish and Byzantine architecture.

Notre-Dame d'Afrique

Notre-Dame d'Afrique (Our Lady of Africa) is a Roman Catholic basilica in Algiers. Louis-Antoine-Augustin Pavy, who served as the Bishop of Algiers from 1846 to 1866, paved the way for its construction. The basilica was inaugurated in 1872, after fourteen years of construction. It was founded by Charles Lavigerie. Its architect, Jean-Eugène Fromageau, who had been appointed the chief architect for ecclesiastical buildings in French Algeria in 1859, employed a Neo-Byzantine style. Its floor plan is unusual as the choir is situated on the southeast instead of the usual east side of the building.

1st November of 1954 Great Mosque

1st November of 1954 Great Mosque is considered to be the largest mosque in Algeria and the second in Africa It is located in the town of Batna. This imposing religious building has been open to the faithful since 2003 and is one of the great architectural achievements of the city.

Saint Augustin Basilica
The Basilique Saint Augustin (Basilica of St Augustine) is a Roman Catholic basilica and Pro-cathedral dedicated to Saint Augustine of Hippo located in Annaba, Algeria. The basilica is under the circumscription of the Diocese of Constantine. Construction of the basilica began in 1881 and finished on March 29, 1900, though the church was not dedicated until April 24, 1914.  The statue of St. Augustine in the basilica contains one of his arm bones. It was built not far from the remains of the Basilica Pacis built by Saint Augustine, where he died while the city was besieged by Vandals.

Cathédrale du Sacré-Cœur d'Oran
Cathédrale du Sacré-Cœur d'Oran is a Roman Catholic church located on the Place de la Kahina, on Boulevard Hammou-boutlelis, in Oran.

Djama'a al-Djedid

Djama'a al-Djedid, also referred to as the Jamaa al-Jadid, Jamaa El Jedid, or the New Mosque, is an Ottoman mosque located in Algiers, the capital of Algeria. It was built in 1660 in accordance with the traditions of the Hanafi school. During the French colonial rule, the mosque was called the Mosquée de la Pêcherie and in English the Mosque of the Fisherman's Wharf.

Great Mosque of Tlemcen
Great Mosque of Tlemcen was first built in Tlemcen, Algeria in 1082. It is one of the best-preserved examples of Almoravid architecture. It was built under sultan Yusuf ibn Tashfin but substantially reconstructed and enlarged by his son Ali ibn Yusuf. An inscription dates this reconstruction to 1136. Sultan Yaghmoracen (1236-1283), the founder of the Abdalwadid dynasty of Tlemcen added a section with a minaret and a dome in the 13th century. Next, to the mosque, there used to be an Islamic court (Makhama) and an Islamic university of considerable fame.

Abdallah Ibn Salam Mosque
Abdallah Ibn Salam Mosque is a mosque in Algeria. Formerly the Great Synagogue of Oran (in Arabic: معبد وهران العظيم), it was built in 1880 at the initiative of Simon Kanoui, but its inauguration took place only in 1918. Also known as Temple Israelite, it is located on the former Boulevard Joffre, currently Boulevard Maata Mohamed El Habib. It was one of the largest synagogues in North Africa.

Once Algeria gained its independence in 1962, almost all Algerian Jews had relocated to France. An estimated 100 to 120 thousand Jews, as well as a million European settlers and 100 thousand Muslim Harkis, had fled Algeria choosing to settle in France during the Pied-Noir exodus.

Algerian Jews relocating to France in the 1960s were assigned "repatriate" status and classed alongside the European settler population owing to the fact that the Jews of Algeria had been French citizens since the Crémieux Decree of 1870.

The Abdallah Ibn Salam mosque is named after the 7th-century Jew from Medina who converted to Islam.

Cultural tourism

]

Algeria benefits from important natural assets such as its beaches in general still in the wild, landscapes and zones like the Algerian Desert. There are 10 national parks in Algeria, including the Tassili Cultural Park (100,000 ha) or the Ahaggar Cultural Park (Hoggar) (380,000 ha)

Hiking enthusiasts have access to the vast mountains of Kabylia. Despite what is thought, Algeria also has a ski area in Tikjda as well as spas.

Architecturally, there are strong Berber, Arabic, Spanish and French influences following colonization, but also more contemporary works. The main post office in Algiers remains a monument of the neo-Moorish type, the work of Jules Voinot and Marius Toudoire. The Casbah of Algiers is also a place of visit classified as a world heritage of UNESCO since 1982.

National Parks 
Ahaggar National Park
Belezma National Park
Chrea National Park
Djurdjura National Park
El Kala National Park
Gouraya National Park
Tassili n'Ajjer National Park
Taza National Park
Theniet El Had National Park
Tlemcen National Park

Museums

 Ahmed Zabana National Museum
 Archaeological Museum of Cherchell
 Bardo National Museum of Prehistory and Ethnography
 Béni Abbès Museum
 Museum of Antiquities (Algiers)
 Museum of Modern Art of Algiers
 Museum of Popular Arts and Traditions
 Museum of the Revolution
 National Museum of Fine Arts of Algiers

Festivals
 International Arab Film Festival
 Timgad International Music Festival
 
 International Book Fair of Algiers
 Nuits de la Saoura
 International Cultural Festival of Algerian Symphonic Music
 Arab-African folk dance festival in Tizi Ouzou
 Algiers International Comics Festival

Saharan Tourism

The Algerian Sahara is one of the most important tourist destinations in Algeria, the Great South is a flagship destination internationally. Hiking is not the only way to discover the Sahara, in fact, camel rides on a Meharée camel or in a 4x4 vehicle, or even formulas combining hiking, camel trekking, and 4x4.

The Algerian Desert is located in north-central Africa and is part of the Sahara Desert. The desert occupies more than four-fifths of the Algerian territory. Its expansion starts from the Saharan Atlas, more or less as a stony desert and the farther inland you get the more of a sand dune desert it becomes.

In the southwestern parts is the mountain range Tassili n'Ajjer located. This area is a subject of great archaeological interest and was put up on the "World Heritage List" by UNESCO in 1982. The area is known for extreme aridity and extreme heat, as daytime temperatures are commonly between 46 °C (113 °F) and 51 °C (122 °F) during the hottest period of the year in most of the desert.

Cities and towns such as Ouargla, Touggourt, Beni Abbes, Adrar, In Salah are among the hottest places on Earth during the height of summer. The annual average rainfall is well below 100  mm (3,93 in) in the northernmost part but the center and the southern part receive much less than 50  mm (1,96 in) and are therefore hyper-arid and among the driest places on Earth.

Among the unmissable places of the Sahara in quote:

 Tamanrasset
 Timimoun
 Djanet
 Ouargla
 Béchar

Therapeutic Tourism

Algeria has many thermal resorts including:
 Hammam Essalihine
 Hammam Guergour
 Hammam Boughrara
 Hammam Bou Hadjar
 Hammam Meskhoutine
 Hammam Soukhna
 Hammam Righa
 Hammam Melouane
 Hammam Ouled Yelles

Cuisine

The cuisine of Algeria is a fusion of Andalusian, Berber, Mediterranean. It differs slightly from region to region. Every region has its own cuisine, including Kabylie, Algiers (couscous) and Constantine.

Algerian cuisine is influenced by various cultures such as Berber, Arabic, and French. Most of the Algerian dishes are centered around lamb or beef, olive oil, fresh vegetables, and fresh herbs. Traditionally, no Algerian meal is complete without bread, normally a long French baguette or more traditionally a flat semolina bread. Pork consumption is forbidden to devout Muslim inhabitants of Algeria in accordance with Sharia, religious laws of Islam.

Algeria, like other Maghreb countries, produces a large range of Mediterranean fruits and vegetables and even some tropical ones. Lamb is commonly consumed. Mediterranean seafood and fish are also eaten and produced by the little inshore fishing.

Algerians consume a high amount of meat, as it is found in almost every dish. Mutton is the most eaten meat in the country. Poultry and beef are also eaten Other uncommon types of meat such as game, birds, and venison are considered a delicacy. Wild boar is also hunted and eaten. While pork is not available in stores, it can only be bought from hunters directly. 

Vegetables that are commonly used include potatoes (batata/betetè), carrots (zrodiya), onions (bsel), tomatoes (tomatish/tømètish), zucchini (corget/qar'a), garlic (ethom), cabbages (cromb), and eggplant (badenjan). Olives (zéton) are also used. Vegetables are often used in stews (jwaz/djwizza) and soups (chorba) or simply fried or boiled.

The Kesra, traditional Algerian flatbread, is the base of Algerian cuisine and eaten at many meals. A popular Algerian meal is merguez, an originally Berber sausage.

A common and one of the most popular dishes of Algerian cuisine is couscous, with other common dishes include shakshouka, Karantita, marqa bel a'assel, a speciality from Tlemcen, and chakhchoukha. Spices used in Algerian cuisine are dried red chillies of different kinds, caraway, Arabian ras el hanout, black pepper and cumin, among others.

Algerians also use tagines, handmade in Algeria. Algerian food is often cooked in clay vessels, much like Maghrib cuisine. Algerian cuisine represents the region north of the Sahara desert and west of the Nile.
Algerian chefs take a lot of pride in cooking skills and methods and their many secrets lie in the variety of ways they mix special spices.

There are many different types of Algerian salads, influenced by French and Turkish cuisine, which may include beetroot or anchovies. There are also dishes of Spanish origin in Algeria, like the Gaspacho Oranais, an Algerian version of a Manchego dish.

Climate 

Northern Algeria is in the temperate zone and has a mild, Mediterranean climate. It lies within approximately the same latitudes as southern California and has somewhat similar climatic conditions. Its broken topography, however, provides sharp local contrasts in both prevailing temperatures and incidence of rainfall. Year-to-year variations in climatic conditions are also common. This area, the most inhabited in Algeria, is commonly referred to as the Tell.

Transportation 

As the tenth-largest country in the world, and the largest in Africa and in the Mediterranean region, Algeria has a vast transportation system which includes many transportation infrastructures.

See also
Tourism in Africa
Visa policy of Algeria
Economy of Algeria
Museums in Algeria

References

External links

 Ministry of Tourism and Handicraft
 Algerian National Tourist Office